Lee Dae-ro Can't Die (also known as Short Time) is a 2005 South Korean action film about a corrupt police officer who is told he has only three months to live, and plots his own death so his wife can collect his insurance policy. The film was released to South Korean cinemas on August 18 and received a total of 838,419 admissions nationwide.

The film is similar to that of the 1990 American dark comedy film, Short Time.

Plot
An officer in the violent crimes division, Dae-ro is a hero in his daughter Hyun-ji's eyes, but in fact he's a corrupt cop, interested only in bribe money and pretty women. He is totally selfish and takes great pains to keep himself out of harm's way, avoiding the danger inherent in his job. One day, while in pursuit of a suspect, Dae-ro faints and is taken to the hospital. There he is told that he has a brain tumor and has about three months to live at most. To provide for his daughter's financial security, Dae-ro plots his own death that will appear accidental so that she will collect a sizable insurance premium.

Cast 
 Lee Beom-soo
 Byeon Ju-yeon
 Choi Sung-kook
 Son Hyun-joo as Tak Mun-bae

References

External links 
 
 

2005 films
South Korean action comedy films
2000s Korean-language films
2000s South Korean films